Jorge Jack Antoni Sikora (born 29 March 2002) is a professional footballer who plays as a defender for Marske United.

Club career
After playing for their youth team, joining at under-13 level, he made his senior debut for Bradford City on 24 September 2019, in the EFL Trophy. After spending time with Ossett United, he moved on loan to F.C. United of Manchester in December 2019, before being recalled by Bradford City in January 2020. He turned professional in July 2020, signing a one-year contract.

On 12 May 2021, he was one of four players offered a new contract by Bradford City. He signed a new one-year contract on 14 June 2021. He was made available for loan to National League clubs in September 2021.

He moved on loan to Spennymoor Town in October 2021. The loan was extended for a second month in November 2021.

Sikora left Bradford City by mutual consent in January 2022.  He then joined up with former loan club F.C. United of Manchester. In June 2022 he moved to Guiseley, making one friendly and 12 competitive appearances for the club.

On 11 November 2022, Sikora joined Marske United for an undisclosed fee.

International career
In December 2018 Sikora met with Polish representatives about representing them.

Career statistics

References

2002 births
Living people
English footballers
Polish footballers
Bradford City A.F.C. players
Ossett United F.C. players
F.C. United of Manchester players
Guiseley A.F.C. players
Spennymoor Town F.C. players
Marske United F.C. players
Association football defenders
English Football League players
Northern Premier League players
National League (English football) players
English people of Polish descent